Lincoln College Preparatory Academy (LCPA) (also known as Lincoln Prep Academy or The Castle on the Hill) is a three-year  middle school and four-year college preparatory magnet school in the Kansas City, Missouri School District. The high school offers International Baccalaureate programs. Founded as a school for African Americans, it was founded in 1865 and became a high school in 1890. It was not integrated until 1978 when it became a magnet school. The student body is now mostly black and hispanic. Less than 20 percent of students are white.

Lincoln was ranked by U.S. News & World Report as one of the "Top 100 High Schools" in the United States in 2012 and 2015. In 2008 and 2014, the school received the Blue Ribbon School Award of Excellence by the United States Department of Education, the highest award an American school can receive.

In 2015, the academy was named the best public school in the State of Missouri.

History 
The first school in Lincoln College Prep's lineage was founded in Kansas City, Missouri in 1865. In 1890, under the leadership of Principal Gabriel N. Grisham, Lincoln became and moved into a high school. The students learned in a church  before 1890.Beginning in 1908, the high school was located at 19th and Tracy Avenue, now  1300 East 19th street. The school moved into an expanded facility at 2111 Woodland Avenue in 1936 under the leadership of Principal Hugh O. Cook. Lincoln High School remained an all-black school through most of segregation.  Lincoln was created for black kids to have a chance, to help them be successful. In 1978, the student body was integrated and the institution obtained a magnet school designation operating under the name Lincoln Academy for Accelerated Study. The name was changed to Lincoln College Preparatory Academy in 1986.

Academics
Lincoln College Preparatory Academy is a middle and high school. More than 90% of its graduates enroll in college. The 2014 graduating class of 151 students received $15.6 million in scholarships, grants and financial aid. High achievement has been consistent, as the 115 graduates in 2002 received scholarships and financial aid in excess of $3 million. The student-teacher ratio is 14.0:1.

Athletics
The Lincoln Blue Tigers actively participate in the following sports:

 Baseball
 Boys' basketball
 Girls' basketball
 Cheerleading
 Dance
 Cross country
 Football
 Gymnastics
 Soccer
 Softball
 Swimming
 Tennis
 Track and field
 Volleyball
Wrestling

Notable alumni
Ida M. Bowman Becks, class of 1899, renowned lecturer, clubwoman, suffragist, and civil rights activist. 
Lucile Bluford, an African-American civil rights advocate and former editor of the Kansas City Call.
Charles Harris, current NFL player
 Jeff Hurd, former NFL player
 Florynce Kennedy, an American lawyer and civil rights advocate
Charlie Parker, American jazz saxophonist.
Reaner Shannon, medical technologist and dean at UMKC School of Medicine
Vernon Vanoy, former NFL and University of Kansas football player
Robert Wedgeworth, librarian and founding President of ProLiteracy Worldwide, an adult literacy organization 
Greg Westbrooks, former NFL player

Extra-curricular activities

 Art Club
Band
 Black Student Union
 Chamber Choir
 Chess Club
 Concert Choir
 Debate
 Drama Club
 FIRST LEGO League
 FIRST Robotics Competition
 Jazz Band
 JROTC
 Key Club
 Math Club
 National Honor Society
 Poetry Club
 Spanish Honor Society
 Sports Broadcasting
 Student Council
 Wind Ensemble
 Yearbook

References

External links

 Official website of Lincoln Athletics
 Lincoln Prep at KCPS
 Lincoln College Preparatory Academy at International Baccalaureate Organization
 Lincoln College Preparatory Academy at U.S. News & World Report

Educational institutions established in 1865
Magnet schools in Missouri
High schools in Kansas City, Missouri
Public high schools in Missouri
Public middle schools in Missouri
Schools in Kansas City, Missouri
School buildings on the National Register of Historic Places in Missouri
National Register of Historic Places in Kansas City, Missouri
1865 establishments in Missouri